Thomas Denne (25 January 1808 – 11 August 1876) was an English cricketer with amateur status. He was a student at Christ Church, Oxford, and played first-class cricket for Oxford University in 1827 and for Marylebone Cricket Club (MCC) and other teams in 1832. His brother David and his nephew Lambert also appeared in cricket matches that have since been adjudged first-class.

References

1808 births
1876 deaths
English cricketers
English cricketers of 1826 to 1863
Oxford University cricketers
Marylebone Cricket Club cricketers
Gentlemen of England cricketers
Alumni of Christ Church, Oxford